Gastrodia lacista, commonly known as the western potato orchid, is a leafless terrestrial mycotrophic orchid in the family Orchidaceae. It has a thin brown flowering stem with up to fifty small, drooping, fawn and white, tube-shaped flowers. It grows in forest and woodland in the south-west of Western Australia.

Description 
Gastrodia lacista is a leafless terrestrial, mycotrophic herb that has a thin, brown crook-like flowering stem bearing between five and fifty drooping, fawn and white, tube-shaped flowers that are warty outside and white inside. The petals have a few blunt teeth on the edges. Flowering occurs from November to January.

Taxonomy and naming
Gastrodia lacista was first formally described in 1991 by David Jones from a specimen collected near Albany in 1989. The description was published in Australian Orchid Research. The specific epithet (lacista) is a Latin word meaning "torn" referring to the edges of the labellum.

Distribution and habitat
The western potato orchid grows in woodland and forest in leaf litter between Bunbury and Albany.

References 

lacista
Plants described in 1991
Terrestrial orchids
Orchids of Western Australia